Qeshlaq-e Marshun (also Romanized as Qeshlāq-e Marshūn) is a village in Howmeh Rural District, in the Central District of Abhar County, Zanjan Province, Iran. At the 2006 census, its population was 15, in 4 families.

References 

Populated places in Abhar County